Valerie Elizabeth Bettis (December 1919 – September 26, 1982) was an American modern dancer and choreographer. She found success in musical theatre, ballet, and as a solo dancer.

Biography
Valerie Bettis was born on either December 19 or December 20, 1919 in Houston, Texas. Her parents were Royal Holt Bettis and Valerie Elizabeth Bettis (McCarthy). Her father died when she was thirteen years old, after which her mother married Hugh Prather. In 1943, Bettis married Bernardo Segall, who was then her company's music director, though the marriage ended in divorce in 1955. In 1959, she married Arthur A. Schmidt who died in 1969. On September 26, 1982, Bettis died at Beth Israel Medical Center in Manhattan at the age of 62.

Career
Valerie Bettis found success both as a modern dancer and as a choreographer, often both in the same production. She was known for her "versatility, vivid stage presence, and flamboyant theatricality."

Early career
Bettis began taking ballet lessons in her hometown of Houston, Texas at the age of 10. While in high school, she participated in her school's dramas and musicals. She attended the University of Texas for only one year, where she was a member of Kappa Alpha Theta, before moving to New York City to study modern dance under Hanya Holm. She performed and toured with Holm's company from 1937 through 1940.

In 1941, Bettis formed her own dance ensemble and began her career as a solo dancer. She found early success with her 1943 solo dance The Desperate Heart, which incorporated the poem of the same name by John Malcolm Brinnin. New York Times dance critic John Martin listed it among the most outstanding performances of 1943. Louis Horst described The Desperate Heart as "the finest solo work in the entire modern dance repertory of this decade."

Ballet
In 1947, Bettis choreographed with a major ballet company. Her production of Virginia Sampler, as performed by the Ballet Russe de Monte Carlo, was called "an interesting and unsuccessful experiment." In 1948, Bettis adapted, directed, and choreographed William Faulkner's novel As I Lay Dying fusing acting and dance into a dance play. John Martin, The New York Times dance critic, called it "a completely authoritative work of art." Doris Hering of Dance Magazine wrote "Only an artist with the deepest feeling for movement and drama could have worked the wonders Miss Bettis did with the material at hand." Bettis's next attempt at a dance play, Domino Furioso, which premiered the 1949 American Dance Festival, was less successful, attracting mixed reviews: "attractive" and "easy to take in", Hering this time wrote, "If Miss Bettis is not careful she will talk us all to death." Bettis found success in 1952 when she choreographed a ballet based on the Tennessee Williams play A Streetcar Named Desire. Critics described it as "gripping" and a "stunning, explosive creation."

Musical theatre
Bettis first tried her hand at musical comedies when she choreographed and performed in Glad to See You in 1944. In 1948, she won a Theatre World Award for her performance in Inside U.S.A., a revue that would run for nearly 400 performances at the New Century Theatre and the Majestic Theatre. Her performance in the 1950 revue Bless You All was praised by Life magazine both for her dancing and for her singing abilities.

Movies
Rita Hayworth's dances to the songs "Trinidad Lady" and "I've Been Kissed Before"  (in the 1952 movie Affair in Trinidad), as well as the "Dance of the Seven Veils" (in the 1953 movie Salome) were choreographed by Valerie Bettis.

Selected choreography

The Desperate Heart (1943)
Yerma (1946)
Virginia Sampler (1947)
As I Lay Dying (1948)
Domino Furioso (1949)The Golden Round (1955)The Past Perfect Hero (1958)Closed Door (1959)Early Voyagers (1960)Songs and Processions (1964)Echoes of Spoon River'' (1976)

References

External links

1920 births
1982 deaths
American choreographers
American female dancers
Donaldson Award winners
Modern dancers
Entertainers from Houston
20th-century American dancers
20th-century American women